Old French law, referred to in French as l'Ancien Droit, was the law of the Kingdom of France until the French Revolution. In the north of France were the Pays de coutumes ('customary countries'), where customary laws were in force, while at the south were the Pays de droit écrit ('countries of written law'), where Roman law had remained paramount. Roughly speaking, the line separating the two areas was the river Loire, from Geneva to the mouth of the Charente, although this was not a firm border between the two categories of law. As worded by George Mousourakis, "in both zones, the law in force also included elements derived from royal, feudal, and canonical sources."

Pays de coutumes
 
In the north existed a variety of customs "with a Frankish-Germanic character."

The coutumes were asserted and enforced under feudalism during the Middle Ages and in the early modern period by the French kings and their vassals, especially in the lands of the Île-de-France, to the exclusion of Roman law. A number of regional customs were compiled in custumals starting from the 13th century: e.g. the Coutumes de Beauvaisis, compiled by Phillipe de Remy. By the 16th century, the Coutume de Paris (first published in 1510) would eventually extend to all of the Parliament of Paris' jurisdiction and beyond in cases of lacunae in the local customs. Antoine Loysel published a work of 958 legal maxims developed over a period of 40 years distilling the coutumes in his  in 1607.  Further development of customary law had been halted by the late 16th century.

For example, Claude de Ferrière commented that "community of goods" ("a partnership between married persons of all personal property, and of all real property acquired during the marriage state") prevailed "throughout all customary France, except Normandy, Rheims and Auvergne."

Pays de droit écrit
As worded by George Mousourakis, "after the revival of Roman law in the late eleventh and twelfth centuries and the spread of its study from Bologna to Montpellier and other parts of France, the Roman law of Justinian was rapidly received in southern France and came to be accepted as the living law of the land", even though, as emphasized by Ernest Glasson, "coutumes did develop in those southern regions, and they often contradicted Roman law." "Prior to this, the pays de droit écrit in the south followed pre-Justinian Roman law, based primarily on the Code of Theodosius II (A.D. 438)", as reissued in the Alarician Breviary. As worded by Antonio Padoa-Schioppa,

Attempts at codifying

In the 18th century, Voltaire declared that in travelling through France one changed the laws as often as one changed horses.

When the Napoleonic Code entered into force in 1804 all the coutumes were abolished. However, French customary law was incorporated into the substance of the code.

North America

In 1664, under the royal act creating the French East India Company, the Custom of Paris became the only law of the land in New France. In 1866 the Civil Code of Lower Canada was adopted in Lower Canada. The majority of the Code's rules borrowed heavily from the Custom of Paris.

See also
 Legal history of France

References

 
Customary legal systems
Custom